Maxwell John Cresswell (born 19 November 1939) is a New Zealand philosopher and logician, known for his work in modal logic.

Education and career 
Cresswell received his B.A. in 1960 and M.A. in 1961 from the University of New Zealand and then with the support of a Commonwealth Scholarship attended the Victoria University of Manchester, where he received in 1964 his PhD under the supervision of A. N. Prior. Cresswell's thesis was titled General and Specific Logics of Functions of Propositions. After returning to New Zealand, Cresswell was at the Victoria University of Wellington, from 1963 to 1967 as a lecturer, from 1968 to 1972 as a senior lecturer (also receiving in 1972 Lit.D. from the Victoria University), becoming a reader in 1973, and then a professor from 1974 to 2000, interrupted by several visiting professorships. In 2001 he became professor emeritus and a member of the Centre for Logic, Language and Computation, Victoria University of Wellington and has been a visiting or fixed-term professor at several universities.

Cresswell's research deals with the philosophy of logic, modal logic and formal semantics. He has also published on ancient Greek philosophy, on the logic of the nineteenth century, and on the philosophy of John Locke. With his colleague and former teacher G. E. Hughes, Cresswell was the co-author of An Introduction to Modal Logic, London, Methuen, 1968); this was the first modern textbook on modal logic and introduced many students to Kripke semantics.

Publications

Monographs and collections 

 with G. E. Hughes, An Introduction to Modal Logic, London, Methuen, 1968, German trans.: Einführung in die Modallogik. Berlin, New York : de Gruyter, 1978
 Logics and Languages, London, Methuen, 1973, German trans.: Die Sprachen der Logik und die Logik der Sprache, Berlin, New York : de Gruyter, 1979
 with G. E. Hughes, A Companion to Modal Logic, London, Methuen, 1984
 Structured Meanings: The Semantics of Propositional Attitudes, Bradford Books/MIT Press, 1985
 Adverbial Modification, Dordrecht, Reidel, 1985
 Semantical Essays: Possible Worlds and Their Rivals, Dordrecht, Kluwer Academic Publishers, 1988
 Entities and Indices, Dordrecht, Kluwer, 1990
 Language in the World, Cambridge, Cambridge University Press, 1994
 Semantic Indexicality, Dordrecht, Kluwer, 1996
 with G. E. Hughes, A New Introduction to Modal Logic, London, Routledge, 1996

References

1939 births
New Zealand logicians
New Zealand philosophers
University of New Zealand alumni
Alumni of the University of Manchester
Academic staff of the Victoria University of Wellington
Living people